Argyresthia fundella is a moth of the family Yponomeutidae. It is found in most of Europe, except Ireland, Great Britain, the Iberian Peninsula, Finland, the Baltic region, Slovenia, Hungary and Greece.

The wingspan is 9–10 mm.

The larvae feed on Abies alba, Abies balsamea, Abies concolor, Abies grandis, Abies nordmanniana and Abies numidica. They mine the leaves of their host plant. The mine is usually only found in the distal half of the leaf. Initially,  the larva feeds towards the tip. It then descends along the other side of the leaf. Most frass is deposited in the leaf tip. A round hole is made at the base of the mine, which the larva uses to leave the mine. This hole is closed with silk. A single larva creates mines in several leaves before overwintering inside the mine. Pupation takes place outside of the mine at the underside of a leaf. The larvae have a dirty dark green body and a black head. They can be found from late summer to April.

References

Moths described in 1835
Argyresthia
Moths of Europe
Taxa named by Josef Emanuel Fischer von Röslerstamm